Mangat is a village and Union Council of Mandi Bahauddin District in the Punjab province of Pakistan. 

It is located at 32°31'0N 73°30'0E and has an altitude of 223 metres (734 feet).

References 

Union councils of Mandi Bahauddin District
Villages in Mandi Bahauddin District